Michelangelo Ricciolini (29 September 1654 – 10 December 1715) was an Italian painter of the Baroque period.

He first studied at Rome under Angelo Canini, then joined the large studio of Carlo Maratta. He painted various works in Rome, including the dome of Santa Rita da Cascia alle Vergini.

References

17th-century Italian painters
18th-century Italian painters
Italian male painters
Italian Baroque painters
1654 births
1715 deaths
Pupils of Carlo Maratta
18th-century Italian male artists